The following highways are numbered 708:

Costa Rica
 National Route 708

United States